Rakša is a village and municipality in Turčianske Teplice District in the Žilina Region of northern central Slovakia.

History
In historical records the village was first mentioned in 1277.

Famous Residents

Michal Miloslav Hodža, the famous Slovak national revivalist, priest, poet and linguist was born on 22 September 1811 in Rakša.

Geography
The municipality lies at an altitude of 507 metres and covers an area of 11.738 km2. It has a population of about 219 people.

References

External links
Official homepage

Villages and municipalities in Turčianske Teplice District